Dortmund I is an electoral constituency (German: Wahlkreis) represented in the Bundestag. It elects one member via first-past-the-post voting. Under the current constituency numbering system, it is designated as constituency 142. It is located in the Ruhr region of North Rhine-Westphalia, comprising the western part of the city of Dortmund.

Dortmund I was created for the inaugural 1949 federal election. Since 2021, it has been represented by Jens Peick of the Social Democratic Party (SPD).

Geography
Dortmund I is located in the Ruhr region of North Rhine-Westphalia. As of the 2021 federal election, it comprises the Stadtbezirke of 6 Hombruch, 8 Huckarde, 7 Lütgendortmund, 9 Mengede, and the Stadtteile of Innenstadt-West and Innenstadt-Ost from 0 Innenstadt.

History
Dortmund I was created in 1949. In the 1949 election, it was North Rhine-Westphalia constituency 56 in the numbering system. From 1953 through 1961, it was number 115. From 1965 through 1976, it was number 114. From 1980 through 1998, it was number 113. From 2002 through 2009, it was number 143. Since 2013, it has been number 142.

Originally, the constituency comprised the northwestern part of the independent city of Dortmund. From 1980 through 1998, it comprised the Stadtbezirk of 8 Huckarde as well as the Stadtteile of Innenstadt-Ost and Innenstadt-West from 0 Innenstadt. It acquired its current borders in the 2002 election.

Members
The constituency has been held continuously by the Social Democratic Party (SPD) since its creation. It was first represented by Fritz Henßler from 1949 to 1953, when he was succeeded by Walter Menzel until 1961. Werner Zeitler then served two terms. Hans-Eberhard Urbaniak was elected in 1980 and was representative until 2002. Marco Bülow was elected in 2002, and re-elected in 2005, 2009, 2013, and 2017. Bülow left the SPD in November 2018 and served as an independent; in November 2020, he joined Die PARTEI, becoming its first member of the Bundestag. Jens Peick regained the constituency for the SPD in 2021.

Election results

2021 election

2017 election

2013 election

2009 election

Notes

References

Federal electoral districts in North Rhine-Westphalia
1949 establishments in West Germany
Constituencies established in 1949
Dortmund